Moral Boundaries: A Political Argument for an Ethic of Care Book by Joan C. Tronto is an American book  published in 1993, contributing to the debate over the ethics of care through a feminist lens.

References

 
1993 books
Standard works